Douglas Henderson may refer to:

 Douglas Henderson (SNP politician) (1935–2006), Scottish National Party politician
 Douglas Henderson (ambassador) (1914–2010), American diplomat
 Douglas Henderson (actor) (1919–1978), American actor
 Douglas Mackay Henderson (1927–2007), Scottish botanist
 Doug Henderson (Labour politician) (born 1949), British Labour Party politician
 Doug Henderson (artist) (born 1949), American illustrator and artist
 Doug Henderson (footballer) (1913–2002), English professional footballer
 Doug Henderson (musician) (born 1960), American musician and recording engineer
 Dougie Henderson, musician, member of Marmalade
 Jocko Henderson (Douglas Henderson, 1918–2000), American radio personality

See also